The knockout stage of the 1930 FIFA World Cup was played between 26 and 30 July 1930. The semi-finals were played on 26 and 27 July, with two rest days before the final on 30 July.

Format
According to the format of the tournament, the 13 participants were divided into four pools. The winner of each group would progress to the semi-finals of the knockout stage. Since there were no predefined brackets, a draw took place in 23 July to decide the semi-final meetings. Hosts Uruguay were drawn to play Yugoslavia. Argentina and the United States would contest the other semi-final.

Qualified teams
The top placed team from each of the four groups qualified for the knockout stage.

Bracket

Semi-finals

Argentina vs United States
The match was even until American center-half Raphael Tracey was injured in the 19th minute. Soon after, Argentina scored the opener with their own center-half, Luis Monti. Tracey left the game at half-time and, since no substitutions were allowed at the time, the United States had to play the second half with 10 men. They also saw goalkeeper Jimmy Douglas hurt his shoulder 15 minutes into the second half. The Argentines scored five more times and went on to win the match, becoming the first team qualified for a World Cup final.

|valign="top"|
|style="vertical-align:top; width:50%"|

|}

Uruguay vs Yugoslavia
Yugoslavia opened the score in the 4th minute with Đorđe Vujadinović and had a disallowed goal in the 9th. The Uruguayans made a recovery and Pedro Cea equalized. They took the lead still in the first half with two more goals. In the second half, the host nation sealed the result three more times, and Cea completed a hat-trick. The Yugoslavs heavily contested refereeing decisions on the third and fourth Uruguayan goals, but to no avail. Uruguay advanced to the final in home soil.

{{#invoke:transcludable section|main|section=4-2|text={{football box
|date=27 July 1930
|time=14:45 UYT (UTC−03:30)
|team1=
|score=6–1
|report=Report
|team2= Yugoslavia
|goals1=Cea Anselmo Iriarte |goals2=Vujadinović |stadium=Estadio Centenario, Montevideo
|attendance=79,867
|referee=Gilberto de Almeida Rêgo (Brazil) }}}}

|valign="top"|
|style="vertical-align:top; width:50%"|

|}

Final

References

External links
FIFA - Uruguay 1930

1930 FIFA World Cup
1930
Yugoslavia at the 1930 FIFA World Cup
United States at the 1930 FIFA World Cup
Argentina at the 1930 FIFA World Cup
Uruguay at the 1930 FIFA World Cup